Eurychone is a genus of flowering plants from the orchid family, Orchidaceae. The genus was founded in 1918 by Rudolf Schlechter. It contains two known species, both native to tropical Africa.

Eurychone galeandrae (Rchb.f.) Schltr. - from Ivory Coast to Angola
Eurychone rothschildiana (O'Brien) Schltr. - from Liberia to Uganda

See also 
 List of Orchidaceae genera

References 

 
 Pridgeon, A.M., Cribb, P.J., Chase, M.A. & Rasmussen, F. eds. (1999). Genera Orchidacearum 1. Oxford Univ. Press.
 Pridgeon, A.M., Cribb, P.J., Chase, M.A. & Rasmussen, F. eds. (2001). Genera Orchidacearum 2. Oxford Univ. Press.
 Pridgeon, A.M., Cribb, P.J., Chase, M.A. & Rasmussen, F. eds. (2003). Genera Orchidacearum 3. Oxford Univ. Press
 Berg Pana, H. 2005. Handbuch der Orchideen-Namen. Dictionary of Orchid Names. Dizionario dei nomi delle orchidee. Ulmer, Stuttgart

External links 

Orchids of Africa
Vandeae genera
Angraecinae